Ležimir is a village in Serbia. It is located in the Sremska Mitrovica municipality, in the Srem District, Vojvodina province. The village has a Serb ethnic majority and its population numbers 947 people (2002 census).

Name
In Serbian, the village is known as Ležimir (Лежимир), in Croatian as Ležimir, and in Hungarian as Nagylemzsér. Its name derived from Serbian words "ležati" ("repose" in English) and "mir" ("peace" in English).

Historical population

1961: 1,128
1971: 1,127
1981: 1,006
1991: 913

See also
List of places in Serbia
List of cities, towns and villages in Vojvodina

References
Slobodan Ćurčić, Broj stanovnika Vojvodine, Novi Sad, 1996.

Populated places in Syrmia
Sremska Mitrovica